Gugou Hui Ethnic Township is an ethnic township in Panji District, Huainan, Anhui.

References

Panji District
Township-level divisions of Anhui
Ethnic townships of the People's Republic of China